Michael Ballhaus, A.S.C. (5 August 1935 – 12 April 2017) was a German cinematographer who collaborated with directors such as Rainer Werner Fassbinder, Martin Scorsese, Mike Nichols, and James L. Brooks. He was a member of both the Academy of Arts, Berlin, and the American Society of Cinematographers.

Early life 
His uncle was actor and director Carl Ballhaus. Ballhaus was influenced by family friend Max Ophüls, and appeared as an extra in Ophüls' last film Lola Montès (1955).

Career 
Ballhaus came to prominence with his work with Rainer Werner Fassbinder beginning with Whity (1971), in addition to The Bitter Tears of Petra von Kant (1972), Chinese Roulette (1976) and The Marriage of Maria Braun (1978). In 1990, he was the head of the jury at the 40th Berlin International Film Festival.

After settling in the United States, he worked on many American films, such as Baby It's You (1983) for John Sayles; Old Enough (1984) for Marisa Silver; Under the Cherry Moon (1986) for Prince; After Hours (1985), The Color of Money (1986), The Last Temptation of Christ (1988), Goodfellas (1990), The Age of Innocence (1993), Gangs of New York (2002) and The Departed (2006) for Martin Scorsese; Broadcast News (1987) and I'll Do Anything (1994) for James L. Brooks; The Fabulous Baker Boys (1989) for Steve Kloves; Bram Stoker's Dracula (1992) for Francis Ford Coppola; Sleepers (1996) for Barry Levinson; and Wild Wild West (1999) for Barry Sonnenfeld. Ballhaus appeared in Rosa von Praunheim's film Fassbinder's Women (2000).

Ballhaus was nominated three times for the Academy Award for Best Cinematography for his work on Broadcast News, The Fabulous Baker Boys and Gangs of New York, but never won. Despite this, he did win the Chicago Film Critics Association Award for Best Cinematography for his work on Bram Stoker's Dracula; both the Boston Society of Film Critics and Los Angeles Film Critics Association Award for Best Cinematography for his work on The Fabulous Baker Boys; and the Los Angeles Film Critics Association Award for Best Cinematography for his work on Goodfellas.

His documentary In Berlin, made with Ciro Cappellari, was released in May 2009.

Ballhaus's final film was Sherry Hormann's 3096 Days in 2013.

Personal life and death 
Ballhaus was married to actress and art director Helga Maria Betten from 1958 until her death in 2006. She appeared in a handful of films, such as those directed by Fassbinder. They had two sons: cinematographer Florian and assistant director Jan Sebastian.

In 2011, Ballhaus married German-American film director Sherry Hormann, who is known for Desert Flower. He died at his home in Berlin on 12 April 2017, at the age of 81, after a short illness.

Filmography

Awards 
 2007 Bavarian Film Awards Honorary Award

See also
 List of German-speaking Academy Award winners and nominees

References

External links 

 
 Cinemascope interview
 Michael Ballhaus in Genealogy Wiki

1935 births
2017 deaths
Film people from Berlin
European Film Awards winners (people)
Honorary Golden Bear recipients
Members of the Academy of Arts, Berlin
Recipients of the Order of Merit of Berlin
German cinematographers
German expatriates in the United States
Commanders Crosses of the Order of Merit of the Federal Republic of Germany